A Boyfriend for My Wife is a 2022 Spanish romantic comedy film directed by Laura Mañá, remaking the 2008 Argentine film of the same name. It stars Diego Martín, Belén Cuesta, and Hugo Silva.

Plot 
Diego wants to separate from his wife Lucía, but rather than facing the issue upfront, he hires a purportedly professional handsome devil (Cuervo Flores) to seduce Lucía, so Lucía be the one to bring their marriage to an end.

Cast

Production 
It was shot in Barcelona in 2021.

Release 
Distributed by Universal Pictures International Spain, the film was theatrically released in Spain on 22 July 2022.

Reception 
Andrea G. Bermejo of Cinemanía rated the film 2½ out of 5 stars considering that the film loses its initial punch as it advances, otherwise highlighting Cuesta's "superb" performance as a disenchanted woman.

Blai Morell of Fotogramas rated the film 3 out of 5 stars, assessing that Mañá "takes everything that was good, which was not much", from Juan Taratuto's film, giving it a more sophisticated look, polishing dialogues and situations, and letting the lead trio shine.

Beatriz Martínez of El Periódico de Catalunya rated the film 2 out of 5 stars, considering that the cast (except Silva), including an "uninspiring" couple played by Cuesta and Martín, is largely interchangeable, although she conceded that "at least it does not insult the viewer's intelligence like other [comedies]", has some good gags and it runs without embarrassing jolts.

Carmen L. Lobo of La Razón rated the film 3 out of 5 stars, considering that Mañá managed to deliver a "funny comedy with really salacious situations thanks to its excellent cast".

Accolades 

|-
| rowspan = "1" align = "center" | 2023 || rowspan = "12" | 2nd Carmen Awards || Best Actress || Belén Cuesta ||  || rowspan = "1" | 
|}

See also 
 List of Spanish films of 2022

References 

Arcadia Motion Pictures films
2020s Spanish-language films
Spanish romantic comedy films
Spanish remakes of Argentine films
2022 romantic comedy films
Films shot in Barcelona
2020s Spanish films